Stonycreek Township is the name of some places in the U.S. state of Pennsylvania:

Stonycreek Township, Cambria County, Pennsylvania
Stonycreek Township, Somerset County, Pennsylvania

Pennsylvania township disambiguation pages